Tribeni Baljagat  is a private school in Bayarban VDC - 7 Ramailo Morang.

Schools in Nepal
Kanepokhari Rural Municipality